is a private university in Tokushima, Japan.

History 
In 1895, Sai Murasaki founded a private vocational school. In 1966, "Tokushima Women's University" was founded. In 1972, "Tokushima Women`s University" was renamed "Tokushima Bunri University".

In 1983, Tokushima Bunri University Kagawa Campus opens.

After several years of exchanges between Tokushima Bunri University and the University of Music and Performing Arts, Vienna, in 2000 a formal agreement was signed. One result is that professors from Vienna now come to Bunri to offer summer and winter cooperative seminars.

Tokushima Bunri University wanted to focus more on music treatment and conducted a mutual agreement with Shenandoah University, Virginia, USA whose professors actively pursue research on this topic.

Faculty 
 Pharmaceutical Science
 Engineering
 Pharmaceutical Science at Kagawa Campus
 Human Life Sciences
 Policy Studies
 Literature
 Music
 Junior College

Attached schools

 Tokushima Bunri kindergarten 
 Tokushima Bunri high school

Sister school

Notable associates
 Hiroyuki Nagao - kayaker, 2008 Summer Olympics representative of Japan
 Michael Frischenschlager - Violinist, former president of University of Music and Performing Arts, Vienna, emeritus professor of Bunri University
 Giuseppe Mariotti - pianist, professor of Bunri University.
 Ernst Friedrich Seiler - pianist, professor of Bunri University in 1974–1996.

External links 
 official site 
 official site 

Universities and colleges in Kagawa Prefecture
Universities and colleges in Tokushima Prefecture
Private universities and colleges in Japan
Tokushima (city)